The Pterophoridae or plume moths are a family of Lepidoptera with unusually modified wings. Though they belong to the Apoditrysia like the larger moths and the butterflies, unlike these they are tiny and were formerly included among the assemblage called "microlepidoptera".

Description and ecology

The forewings of plume moths usually consist of two curved spars with more or less bedraggled bristles trailing behind. This resembles the closely related Alucitidae (many-plumed moths) at first glance, but the latter have a greater number of symmetrical plumes. The hindwings are similarly constructed, but have three spars. This unorthodox structure does not prevent flight. A few genera have normal lepidopteran wings.

The usual resting posture is with the wings extended laterally and narrowly rolled up. Often they resemble a piece of dried grass, and may pass unnoticed by potential predators even when resting in exposed situations in daylight. Some species have larvae which are stem- or root-borers while others are leaf-browsers.

Economically important pterophorids include the artichoke plume moth (Platyptilia carduidactyla), an artichoke (Cynara cardunculus) pest in California, while the geranium plume moth (Platyptilia pica) and the snapdragon plume moth (Stenoptilodes antirrhina) can cause damage to the ornamental plants garden geranium (Pelargonium x hortorum) and common snapdragon (Antirrhinum majus), respectively. Other plume moths have been used as biological control agents against invasive plant species – Lantanophaga pusillidactyla against West Indian lantana (Lantana camara), Oidaematophorus beneficus against mistflower (Ageratina riparia), Hellinsia balanotes against groundsel bush (Baccharis halimifolia), and Wheeleria spilodactylus against horehound (Marrubium vulgare).

Evolution 
A fossil species from the extant genus Merrifieldia is known from the Oligocene of France.

Taxonomy
The small group of moths in the genus Agdistopis has often been treated as a subfamily Macropiratinae within the Pterophoridae, but recent research indicates that this group should be considered a separate family.

The family is divided into the following subfamilies, tribes and genera, some species are also listed:

Subfamily Agdistinae
 Genus Agdistis Hübner, 1825
 Agdistis bouyeri
 Agdistis linnaei
Subfamily Ochyroticinae
 Genus Ochyrotica
 Ochyrotica bjoernstadti
Subfamily Deuterocopinae Gielis, 1993
 Genus Deuterocopus
 Genus Heptaloba
 Genus Hexadactilia
 Genus Leptodeuterocopus
Subfamily Pterophorinae Zeller, 1841
 Tribe Tetraschalini
 Genus Tetraschalis
 Genus Titanoptilus
 Genus Walsinghamiella
 Tribe Platyptiliini
 Genus Amblyptilia Hübner, 1825
 Amblyptilia acanthadactyla
 Genus Anstenoptilia
 Genus Asiaephorus
 Genus Bigotilia
 Genus Bipunctiphorus
 Genus Buszkoiana
 Genus Cnaemidophorus Wallengren, 1862
 Cnaemidophorus rhododactyla
 Genus Crocydoscelus
 Genus Fletcherella
 Genus Gillmeria Tutt, 1905
 Gillmeria ochrodactyla
 Genus Inferuncus
 Genus Koremaguia
 Genus Lantanophaga Zimmermann, 1958
 Lantanophaga pusillidactyla
 Genus Leesi
 Genus Lioptilodes
 Genus Melanoptilia
 Genus Michaelophorus
 Genus Nippoptilia
 Genus Paraamblyptilia
 Genus Paraplatyptilia
 Genus Platyptilia Hübner, 1825
 Platyptilia aarviki
 Platyptilia carduidactyla – artichoke plume moth
 Platyptilia celidotus
 Platyptilia eberti
 Platyptilia falcatalis
 Platyptilia gonodactyla
 Platyptilia nussi
 Genus Platyptiliodes
 Genus Postplatyptilia
 Genus Quadriptilia
 Genus Sinpunctiptilia
 Sinpunctiptilia emissalis
 Genus Sochchora
 Genus Sphenarches
 Genus Stenoptilia Hübner, 1825
 Stenoptilia bipunctidactyla
 Stenoptilia kiitulo
 Stenoptilia pterodactyla
 Stenoptilia zophodactylus
 Genus Stenoptilodes Zimmermann, 1958
 Stenoptilodes antirrhina – snapdragon plume moth
 Genus Stockophorus
 Genus Uroloba
 Genus Vietteilus
 Genus Xyroptila Tribe Exelastini
 Genus Arcoptilia
 Genus Exelastis
 Exelastis caroli
 Genus Fuscoptilia
 Genus Marasmarcha
 Genus Parafuscoptilia
 Tribe Oxyptilini
 Genus Apoxyptilus Alipanah et al., 2010
 Genus Buckleria Tutt, 1905
 Buckleria vanderwolfi
 Genus Capperia
 Genus Crombrugghia
 Genus Dejongia
 Genus Eucapperia
 Eucapperia continentalis
 Genus Geina
 Genus Intercapperia
 Genus Megalorhipida Amsel, 1935
 Megalorrhipida leucodactyla
 Genus Oxyptilus
 Genus Paracapperia
 Genus Prichotilus Rose and Pooni, 2003
 Genus Procapperia
 Genus Pseudoxyptilus Alipanah et al., 2010
 Genus Stangeia Tutt, 1905
 Stangeia xerodes
 Genus Stenodacma
 Genus Tomotilus
 Genus Trichoptilus
 Tribe Oidaematophorini
 Genus Adaina
 Genus Crassuncus
 Genus Emmelina Tutt, 1905
 Emmelina monodactyla
 Genus Gypsochares
 Genus Hellinsia Tutt, 1905
 Hellinsia balanotes
 Hellinsia emmelinoida
 Genus Helpaphorus
 Genus Karachia
 Genus Oidaematophorus Wallengren, 1862
 Oidaematophorus beneficus
 Genus Picardia
 Genus Pselnophorus Wallengren, 1881
 Pselnophorus meruensis
 Genus Puerphorus
 Genus Setosipennula
 Tribe Pterophorini
 Genus Calyciphora
 Genus Cosmoclostis
 Cosmoclostis aglaodesma
 Cosmoclostis hemiadelpha
 Cosmoclostis pesseuta
 Genus Diacrotricha
 Genus Imbophorus
 Imbophorus aptalis
 Imbophorus leucophasmus
 Imbophorus pallidus
 Genus Merrifieldia
 Genus Oirata
 Genus Patagonophorus
 Genus Porrittia
 Genus Pterophorus
 Pterophorus pentadactyla – white plume moth
 Genus Septuaginta
 Genus Singularia
 Genus Tabulaephorus
 Genus Wheeleria Tutt, 1905
 Wheeleria spilodactylus

Footnotes

References
  (2002): Factors affecting the establishment of a classical biological control agent, the horehound plume moth (Wheeleria spilodactylus) in South Australia. (A thesis submitted for the degree of Doctor of Philosophy in the Department of Applied and Molecular Ecology, Adelaide University, Australia) PDF fulltext
  (1980): Geranium Plume Moth Quarantine. PDF fulltext
  (1992): Foodplant Specificity and Biology of Oidaematophorus balanotes (Pterophoridae): A North American Moth Introduced into Australia for the Control of Baccharis halimifolia (Journal of the Lepidopterists' Society 46(3), 1992: 195-202). PDF fulltext
  (1984): Mate-locating and courtship behaviors of the artichoke plume moth, Platyptilia carduidactyla (Lepidoptera: Pterophoridae) (Environmental Entomology 13.2 1984: 399-408). https://academic.oup.com/ee/article-abstract/13/2/399/2393151]

External links 

 British Insects: the Families of Lepidoptera 
 http://www.plumemoth.com/ D.L. Matthews, PhD. Florida Museum
 The Plume Moths of Australia
 A slow-motion video of a flying plume moth, taken by three fast cameras https://www.beatus-lab.org/fun-stuff

 
Moth families